Alfredo Jaar (born 1956) is a Chilean-born artist, architect, photographer and filmmaker who lives in New York City. He is mostly known as an installation artist, often incorporating photography and covering socio-political issues and war—the best known perhaps being the 6-year-long The Rwanda Project about the 1994 Rwandan genocide. He has also made numerous public intervention works, like The Skoghall Konsthall one-day paper museum in Sweden, an early electronic billboard intervention A Logo For America, and The Cloud, a performance project on both sides of the Mexico-USA border. He has been featured on Art:21. He won the Hasselblad Award for 2020.

He is the father of musician and composer Nicolas Jaar.

Early life
Jaar was born in 1956 in Santiago de Chile. From age 5 to 16, he lived in Martinique before moving back to Chile. In 1982, he moved permanently to New York City.

Work

Jaar art is usually politically motivated, with strategies of representation of real events, the faces of war or the globalized world, and sometimes with a certain level of viewer participation (in the case of many public interventions and performances).
 
"There's this huge gap between reality and its possible representations. And that gap is impossible to close. So as artists, we must try different strategies for representation. [...] [A] process of identification is fundamental to create empathy, to create solidarity, to create intellectual involvement."

Exhibitions

His work has been shown extensively around the world, notably in the Biennales of Venice (1986, 2007), São Paulo (1987, 1989, 2010, 2021), Istanbul (1995), Kwangju (1995, 2000), Johannesburg (1997), Seville (2006), and the Whitney Biennial (2022).

His work, Park of the Laments was part of the Virginia B. Fairbanks Art & Nature Park: 100 Acres which opened in 2010 at the Indianapolis Museum of Art. For the "Revolution vs Revolution" exhibition held at the Beirut Art Center, he produced a new version of his photographic project 1968.

Important individual exhibitions include the New Museum of Contemporary Art, New York (1992); Whitechapel Gallery, London (1992); Museum of Contemporary Art, Chicago (1992); Moderna Museet, Stockholm (1994); Museum of Contemporary Art of Rome (2005); Fundación Telefónica, Santiago (2006); Musée des Beaux Arts, Lausanne (2007); the South London Gallery in 2008.; and Yorkshire Sculpture Park, Wakefield UK (2018).

Jaar represented Chile at the 2013 Venice Biennale.

One of his two solo exhibitions was shown in Hong Kong as part of the "Hong Kong's Migrant Domestic Workers Project" at Para Site in the exhibition "Afterwork." Hundreds of thousands of Vietnamese "boat people" sought refuge in British Hong Kong after the Vietnam War ended in the late 1970s and continued until the early 1990s.

Awards 
Jaar has been the recipient of many Honorary Doctorates, including the University of Wolverhampton, UK, The School of The Art Institute of Chicago, USA, The New School, New York, USA, SUNY (State University of New York), USA, IDSVA (Institute for Doctoral Studies in the Visual Arts), New York, USA, Accademia di Belle Arti, Macerata, Italy, and Universidad de Talca, Chile.

1985: Guggenheim Fellowship from the John Simon Guggenheim Memorial Foundation
2000: MacArthur Fellow
2013: National Prize for Plastic Arts (Chile)
2018: Hiroshima Art Prize
2020: Hasselblad Award, Gothenburg, Sweden
2022: Mercosur Konex Award, Buenos Aires, Argentina

Family
Alfredo's son Nicolas Jaar is a musician and composer.

References

General references
Alfredo Jaar, Lorenzo Fusi, TAC Collection, Exòrma Ed., Italian/English, May 2012
Stefan Jonsson, 1989: Alfredo Jaar, They Loved It So Much, the Revolution, in A brief history of the masses: three revolutions, New York: Columbia University Press, 2008, pp. 119 ff.
Jaar, Alfredo, Mary J. Jacob, and Nancy Princenthal. Alfredo Jaar: The Fire This Time : Public Interventions 1979-2005. Milano: Charta, 2005. Print. Alfredo Jaar: the fire this time : public interventions 1979-2005
Jaar, Alfredo, and Willie A. Drake. Alfredo Jaar: Geography=war. Richmond, VA: Anderson Gallery, Virginia Commonwealth University, 1991. Print. Alfredo Jaar: geography=war
Jaar, Alfredo. Let There Be Light: The Rwanda Project 1994 – 1998, Barcelona: Actar, 1998. Print.
Solomon-Godeau, Abigail. ‘Lament of the Images: Alfredo Jaar and the Ethics of Representation’ in Aperture, Issue 181, pp 36–48

External links
 
 
 
 

1956 births
Chilean artists
Chilean architects
Chilean photographers
Modern artists
MacArthur Fellows
Living people
American conceptual artists
American installation artists
Chilean people of Palestinian descent
Chilean people of Dutch descent